Louise Brough defeated Beverly Fleitz in the final, 7–5, 8–6 to win the ladies' singles tennis title at the 1955 Wimbledon Championships. Maureen Connolly was the defending champion, but withdrew after breaking her leg.

Seeds

  Doris Hart (semifinals)
  Louise Brough (champion)
  Beverly Fleitz (final)
  Angela Mortimer (second round)
  Dorothy Knode (quarterfinals)
  Darlene Hard (semifinals)
  Beryl Penrose (quarterfinals)
  Angela Buxton (quarterfinals)

Draw

Finals

Top half

Section 1

Section 2

Section 3

Section 4

Bottom half

Section 5

Section 6

Section 7

Section 8

References

External links

Women's Singles
Wimbledon Championship by year – Women's singles
Wimbledon Championships
Wimbledon Championships